United Living Group is a construction company which specialises in new build, planned maintenance, low carbon retrofit, extra care and land & funding opportunities.

History
The company was formed from the merger of Bullock Construction Ltd and United House Ltd (the contracting division of United House Group) in September 2014  with the vision to become the national market leader in the provision of affordable housing and sustainable solutions. Lloyds Development Capital (LDC) had an ownership stake in both companies: in April 2008 LDC invested in the management buy-out of Bullock Construction Limited  and in March 2010, United House secured financial backing from LDC to continue its expansion strategy.

United House
The origin of United House lies with Geoffrey Granter who founded it as Harp Heating in 1964. Initially, the core business was installing central heating in council housing while the tenants remained in occupation. 
Harp Heating broadened this service into an internal refurbishment product for the GLC, installing a package of heating, bathroom, kitchen and electrical works in four days. To achieve this they developed highly organised logistics arrangements, distributing materials on a just in time basis from its 100,000 sq ft warehouse adjacent to the head office at Swanley.
Michael Rayfield was joint MD with Geoffrey Granter of Harp heating before the group changed its name.
After Jeffrey Adams joined the company in 1981, becoming its joint owner with Granter, the company changed its name to United House and expanded into housebuilding and housing refurbishment. In the 1990s, the company won substantial business under the Private Finance Initiative linked to the Decent Homes Programme, and building of new social under the 1997–2010 Labour government.
A development division named Modern City Living was established in 1990. 
United House became the leading housing PFI contractor in the UK, managing over 7,000 homes.
In 2008, Modern City Living was rebranded United House Developments.

Granter retired from the business in 2008 and Steven Halbert joined the board as chairman. Lloyds Development Capital (LDC) invested a minority stake and RBS provided bank loans to fund further expansion in inner city private housebuilding.

Merged company
On 16 September 2014, a restructuring of United House Group was announced. United House's construction business (United House Ltd) merged with Bullock Construction, which was also owned by LDC and has a similar profile to United House Ltd, but worked in other areas of the UK. The new construction company was called United Living Group, and Bullock's CEO Ian Burnett become the Group Chief Executive. Later in 2014, United House Developments, headed by Adams as chairman and Rick de Blaby as CEO, became a separate development company, based in London.

The new brand United Living Group was launched on 1 April 2015.

Merger with the Fastflow Group 
In 2019, United Living and Fastflow Group merged to become United Living Group bringing together their construction, utilities and property maintenance businesses. Fastflow Group CEO, Neil Armstrong becoming CEO and chairman of the new enlarged group. In January 2023, the business reported pre-tax losses of around £21m for the second year running, on revenue of £437m.

Organisation
In order to maintain current contracts, the existing companies were retained, but renamed.  United Living (North) Ltd was formed from Bullock Construction Ltd; United Living (South) Ltd was formed from United House Ltd.  United Living (North) Group Ltd was formed from Pyper Construction Ltd (Bullock's parent company); United Living (South) Holdings Ltd was formed from United House Group Ltd.

References

British companies established in 2014
Housebuilding companies of the United Kingdom
Companies based in Kent
Privately held companies of the United Kingdom
2014 establishments in England